Stanisław Krasiński may refer to:

 Stanisław Krasiński (1558-1617)
 Stanisław Krasiński (1585-1649)

See also
Stanisław Krusiński